Perosa may refer to:

 Perosa Argentina, comune in the Metropolitan City of Turin in the Italian region Piedmont
 Perosa Canavese, comune in the Metropolitan City of Turin in the Italian region Piedmont

See also 
 Villar-Perosa (disambiguation)